Samuel Bowden may refer to:
 Samuel Bowden (poet)
 Samuel Bowden (cricketer)
 Samuel Bowden (Medal of Honor)